David Ilariani (born 20 January 1981 in Tbilisi) is a Georgian sprinter. He competed in the 110 m hurdles event at the 2004, 2008 and 2012 Summer Olympics.

Competition record

Personal bests
Outdoor
110 metres hurdles – 13.58 (+1.8 m/s) (Sliven 2012) 
Long jump – 7.78 m (+1.9 m/s) (Tsakhkadzor 2003)
Indoor
60 metres hurdles – 7.77 (Madrid 2005)
Long jump – 7.37 m (Kyiv 2005)

References

1981 births
Living people
Sportspeople from Tbilisi
Male hurdlers from Georgia (country)
Male long jumpers from Georgia (country)
Male sprinters from Georgia (country)
Olympic athletes of Georgia (country)
Athletes (track and field) at the 2004 Summer Olympics
Athletes (track and field) at the 2008 Summer Olympics
Athletes (track and field) at the 2012 Summer Olympics
World Athletics Championships athletes for Georgia (country)